A by-election was held for the New South Wales Legislative Assembly electorate of Blayney on 12 January 1907 because Paddy Crick resigned from Parliament after findings of corruption made by a Royal Commission. Crick had also been expelled from the Legislative Assembly for outrageous behaviour in the chamber, however he was returned in the resulting by-election.

The Royal Commission handed down an interim report in May 1906, which found that 50% of the sums received by a land agent Peter Close were paid to Crick whilst he was Minister for Lands. The Legislative Assembly proposed to immediately deal with Crick, however the Speaker ruled that the Assembly could not deal with the matter as it might prejudice his criminal trial. Instead the assembly amended its standing orders and suspended Crick pending the outcome of his criminal trial. The jury was unable to reach a unanimous verdict, and the Attorney General declined to prosecute the matter again as evidence before the Royal Commission had been ruled inadmissible in his criminal trial. Crick then submitted his resignation from parliament, however before it was accepted the assembly passed a motion that he was guilty of conduct that rendered him ineligible to sit as a member. Rutledge and Nairn stated this was due to old scores being paid off, while Anne Twomey stated that this motion was passed to influence future voters not to vote for Crick. In any event Crick did not nominate for the by-election.

Dates

Results

Paddy Crick was expelled from the Parliament for corruption.

Aftermath
Paddy Crick was struck off the roll of solicitors on 23 August 1907 because of the evidence before the Royal Commission. He challenged the validity of his suspension in the Supreme Court and was successful before the Full Court, however this was overturned on appeal to the Privy Council which held that the Legislative Assembly was the sole judge whether an "occasion" had arisen that affected the orderly conduct of the Assembly.

Crick stood for parliament again at the September 1907 election for Surry Hills but was unsuccessful. He died the following year.

See also
Electoral results for the district of Blayney
List of New South Wales state by-elections

References

1907 elections in Australia
New South Wales state by-elections
1900s in New South Wales